Clemson University opened in 1893 as an all-male military college. It was not until seventy years later in 1959 that the first fraternities and sororities arrived on campus. In the 1970s, they became recognized as national fraternities and sororities. The Greek life has now increased to 44 chapters on campus: fraternities and sororities from the National Panhellenic Conference, the North American Interfraternity Conference, the Multicultural Greek Council, and the National Pan-Hellenic Council.

The Greek life office is located in Norris Hall. Of the 22,698 enrolled undergraduate students, 18% of males are involved in fraternities while 32% of females are involved in sororities Affiliated men and women have shown to have a higher GPR than nonaffiliated men and women. Clemson University Greek life is unique because Greeks do not have houses on campus but live in separate residence halls. However many fraternities operate large off-campus houses in or near the North Clemson Neighborhood adjacent to campus. These houses roughly fall between 3000sqft-6500sqft and typically house 6-10 persons in full apartment style housing. The restriction on fraternity housing is due to a Clemson city ordinance which prohibits more than 3 unrelated persons from living in the same house/apartment within Clemson city limits (most of the fraternity houses were grandfathered into this rule). Most social functions hosted by fraternities happen at these large off campus houses and most of these functions are multi-fraternity sponsored (fraternities at Clemson tend to socialize with each other more than at other equivalent Universities). Sororities host numerous mixers/functions at bars and various locales in the Clemson downtown area. Popular off-campus activities that Greek life regularly and widely attend include Mountain Weekends (fall trips to mountain cabins hosted separately as a date function by each fraternity), Formals (fraternities usually host formal at a beach front location or large city while sororities tend to rent out ballrooms in the local upstate South Carolina area) and Carolina Cup (semi-annual horse race in spring in Camden, SC).

History
Clemson had a strong military heritage but in 1955 the first women undergraduates arrived campus. By 1955, civilians had arrived on campus and soon fraternities and sororities were an idea in demand.
In 1959 the Board of Trustees approved the development of the first sororities and fraternities.  The idea was recommended to them by Walter Cox and the President at the time, Robert C. Edwards.
Eight men's fraternities and two sororities were founded between 1956-1966. The fraternities/sororities operated under local names until 1970 when Clemson allowed national Greek organizations on campus. In 1956 the Numeral Society (Sigma Alpha Epsilon) was the first fraternity established on campus. From 1958 to 1966, seven more fraternities were recognized by the university, in order of founding: (national affiliation shown in parentheses):  Phi Kappa Delta (Kappa Alpha Order),  'Deacons' Delta Kappa Alpha (Alpha Tau Omega), Kappa Delta Chi (Sigma Nu), 'Zetas'  Sigma Alpha Zeta (Pi Kappa Alpha), 'Snappers' Kappa Sigma Nu (Kappa Sigma), Delta Phi (Phi Delta Theta), and Sigma Kappa Epsilon (Beta Theta Pi). Followed by Alpha Gamma (Sigma Phi Epsilon & Alpha Gamma Rho) and Phi Gamma Delta (FIJI) in 1971 and Chi Lam (Theta Chi) in 1974. Chi Chi Chi, was the first sorority later changing their name to Delta Theta Chi (Tri Delt).  The second sorority was Omicron Zeta Tau (Kappa Kappa Gamma) followed soon after by Sigma Beta Chi. By 1969 three local sororities and 9 local fraternities could be found on campus.  The organizations urged the right to be affiliate with the national organizations and sought help from Dean Delony. On February 1, 1970, Zetas (Pi Kappa Alpha) became first nationally recognized fraternity on Clemson's campus followed soon after by Phi Kappa Delta (Kappa Alpha Order).  Sigma Beta Chi choose to affiliate with Chi Omega, Delta Theta Chi with Delta Delta Delta and Omicron Zeta Tau with Kappa Kappa Gamma.  These sororities would become the first three national sororities on campus.  Delony choose to house the affiliated women in their own dorms instead of building sorority and fraternity houses.  The sororities continued to grow in number, the fourth sorority being Kappa Alpha Theta followed by Alpha Delta Pi, Alpha Kappa Alpha and Pi Beta Phi.

Government

College Panhellenic Association
The Panhellenic Council is the governing body for all National Panhellenic Conference (NPC) organizations on campus. It is made up of delegates of all 13 sororities of Clemson University representing 1,500 women. Panhellenic sororities participate in rush once a year in the fall semester usually 1–2 weeks into the start of the academic year. Panhellenic strives for "commitment to academics and service and our strong student presence in campus wide organizations and leadership positions."  There are six executive board members consisting of the president, Vice President, Vice President of Public Relations and Programming, Vice President of Finance and Education, Vice President of Recruitment, and the Assistant Vice President of Recruitment.  The president and delegate from each chapter must attend meetings every other week.

Panhellenic supports the Circle Of Sisterhood Foundation, whose mission is to lift women in need from poverty, during Panhellenic recruitment.  New members have the chance to help philanthropically through Junior Panhellenic.  Junior Panhellenic plans a new member gala to raise money to train a dog for a local family through the Dogs for Autism organization.   MARYS House (Ministry Alliance for Regaining Your Safety) is the service project Panhellenic works on throughout the school year.  It is a shelter for those who have experienced domestic violence located in Pickens County.

Interfraternity Council
The Interfraternity Council (IFC) is the governing body of fraternities on Clemson's campus representing fraternities from the North American Interfraternity Conference.  The Interfraternity Council is made up of about 1,400 men. IFC fraternities participate in rush twice a year in the fall and spring usually 1–2 weeks into each respective semester.  Similar to the Panhellenic Council, IFC consist of six executive positions: President, Vice President, Vice President of Relations, Vice President of Rush, Vice President of Finance and Vice President of Risk. The council consist of representatives from all 22 chapters.

National Pan-Hellenic Council
The first National Pan-Hellenic Council organization chartered on the campus of Clemson University was Omega Psi Phi fraternity in 1974.  In, 1979 the first NPHC sorority was chartered, Alpha Kappa Alpha.  Currently there are eight organizations active on campus.  The National Pan-Hellenic Council's members participate in several service and philanthropic events.  Each year the National Pan-Hellenic Council host the Fall Fest step show and week of service.  The NPHC is made up of over 100 men and women.

Multicultural Greek Council
This council is made up of five executive members and governs sororities and fraternities that are traditionally based on multicultural values. Greek organizations under this branch are made up of students that focus on inclusion and celebrations of culture. Students in these sororities and fraternities work to spread awareness of Asian and Latino culture and to promote appreciation of diversity.

Greek Programming Board
The Greek Programming Board's purpose is to unite the entire Greek life on campus and in the community including the Collegiate Panhellenic Council, the Interfraternity Council  and the National Pan-Hellenic Council and to endorse and advance Greek Life.  The Greek Programming Board is in charge of hosting the annual Greek week competition.  The board also holds trivia night to raise money for the red cross.

Order of Omega
Order of Omega is a Greek honors society consisting of the top 3% of the Greek community.  Order of Omega sponsors activities such as, Clemson Cup Speech Competition, Holiday Wishes Toy Drive and the Annual Fraternity and Sorority Life Awards Banquet.

Housing
Clemson University currently does not offer sorority and fraternity houses on campus but does set apart certain residence halls for Greeks.  Several fraternities and sororities live on the Quad, a residential area located near the football stadium. The other sororities live in the Barnett and Smith residence halls in an area commonly referred to as "the horseshoe."
Members of Greek organizations who do not live on the hall have card access to the residence halls in which their brothers or sisters are housed. Some groups of brothers in fraternities rent out large (3000 sqft - 6500 sqft) houses in the North Clemson neighborhood adjacent to campus as a pseudo-chapter house and utilize them for social purposes.

List of Chapters

College Panhellenic Association Sororities
List of the 13 College Panhellenic Association chapters currently on campus (listed in alphabetical order)

Interfraternity Council Fraternities
List of the 22 active organizations with the Interfraternity Council (listed alphabetically)

National Pan-Hellenic Council
List of the seven NPHC organizations on campus (listed alphabetically)

Multicultural Greek Council
List of the five multicultural organizations on campus (listed alphabetically)

References

Clemson University
Clemson University